The following is a list of telenovelas produced by Televisa in the 1980s.

1980

1981

1982

1983

1984

1985

1986

1987

1988

1989

References 

Televisa 1980s
Mexican television-related lists
 1980s